Cesar Polanco (born November 29, 1967 in The Dominican Republic) is a retired Dominican boxer.

Professional career

After turning professional in 1983 he had compiled a record of 15-1-1 in 3 years before travelling to Indonesia in 1986 to face IBF super flyweight champion Ellyas Pical. He scored a split decision victory over titleholder Ellyas Pical and became the new IBF champion. Polanco returned to Indonesia later in the year for a rematch and would lose the title via knockout in his first title defense in the third round after getting hit on his solar plexus. Cesar would never challenge for a title again and would end up retiring from the sport in 1993.

See also 
List of super-flyweight boxing champions

References

External links

1967 births
Living people
Flyweight boxers
Super-flyweight boxers
World super-flyweight boxing champions
International Boxing Federation champions
Dominican Republic male boxers
People from Santiago de los Caballeros